Lee Weigel is a former running back in the National Football League.

Biography
Weigel was born on November 15, 1963 in Marshfield, Wisconsin.

Career
Weigel played with the Green Bay Packers during the 1987 NFL season. He played at the collegiate level at the University of Wisconsin-Eau Claire.

See also
List of Green Bay Packers players

References

People from Marshfield, Wisconsin
Players of American football from Wisconsin
Green Bay Packers players
American football running backs
University of Wisconsin–Eau Claire alumni
Living people
1963 births
Wisconsin–Eau Claire Blugolds football players